Prasophyllum brevisepalum is a species of orchid endemic to New South Wales. It has a single tubular, shiny dark green leaf and up to thirty five scented, yellowish to brownish green and white flowers. It is only known from a single population growing in woodland near Inverell.

Description
The flowers are sweetly scented and yellowish to brownish green. As with others in the genus, the flowers are inverted so that the labellum is above the column rather than below it. There is a lance-shaped to egg-shaped yellow to yellowish-green callus in the centre of the labellum, extending well past the bend. Flowering occurs between mid September and mid October.

Taxonomy and naming
Prasophyllum brevisepalum was first formally described in 2018 by David Jones and Lachlan Copeland from a specimen collected near Inverell and the description was published in Australian Orchid Review. The specific epithet (brevisepalum) is derived from the Latin word brevis meaning "short", and the New Latin word sepalum meaning "sepal", referring to the relatively short sepals of this species.

Distribution and habitat
This leek orchid grows in grassy woodland at altitudes of about  near Inverell where it is only known from a single population growing in soil derived from basalt.

References

brevisepalum
Orchids of New South Wales
Endemic orchids of Australia
Plants described in 2018